"" ("Dream in the Twilight", literally "Dream through the twilight"), is both a German poem by Otto Julius Bierbaum and a  (art song) by Richard Strauss, his Op. 29/1. The opening line is "" ("Broad meadows in grey dusk"). It is the first of three songs by Strauss based on love poems by Bierbaum, composed and published in Munich in 1895, and dedicated to Eugen Gura.

Poem 

Bierbaum dedicated the 217 page collection, with Traum durch die Dämmerung on page 130, to Detlev von Liliencron as he expressed in the personal foreword. A second edition of the collection appeared one year later.

The theme is a man going to meet a beloved woman, as in Johann Wolfgang von Goethe's 1771 poem "" (Welcome and Farewell). In Bierbaum's poem, he speaks in the first person.

"" is in two stanzas, each comprising five lines. The first line,  literally: "Wide meadows in twilight grey", was translated by Richard Stokes as "Broad meadows in grey dusk". The third line of the poem describes the walk to meet the woman in first person, after detailing meadows, twilight, the sun and the stars: "" (Now I go to the most beautiful woman). The subject notes that he is not in a rush: "" (I do not go fast). She is not described, but their relationship imagined as a "" (soft, velvety band), drawing him to "" (the love land), reaching a state of "" (mild blue light).

Composition and publication 

Strauss composed  all three songs of Op. 29  on one day, 7 June 1895, the year after he married Pauline de Ahna and settled in Munich, the town of his birth.

Working as assistant conductor at the Munich court opera, he looked for a librettist for a possible opera project and contacted Bierbaum. While no opera came to pass, Strauss liked his poems and set several of them to music, among them the three songs of Op. 29 which he all wrote on 7 June. "" was followed by "" ("Longing Hearts" or "Beating Hearts") and "" (Nighttime Walk).

Strauss reportedly completed "" in the only 20 minutes his wife gave him before an errand. He scored the three songs, which all contemplate walking, for medium voice and piano, and dedicated them to Eugen Gura, a leading baritone of the court opera in Munich.

The songs were first published in Munich by Joseph Aibl. They were then published by Universal Edition. "" appeared also in English in a translation by John Bernhoff and Nelia Fabretto, in transpositions for low and high voice, and with an orchestral arrangement by Robert Heger.  Strauss quoted the music, as several other early works, in the fifth section of his tone poem  Ein Heldenleben (A Hero's Life), Op. 40, completed in 1898, which is usually considered autobiographical in tone.

Music 
A typical performance takes around three minutes. In the version for medium voice, the music of "" begins in F-sharp major. It is in 2/4 time and marked "Sehr ruhig" (very calm). The two stanzas are through-composed, with two slight changes to the text: Strauss added the word "hin" to the third line and changed the order of the adjectives in the last line. The song is completed by a modified repeat of the last three lines, this time in Bierbaum's word order.

The even time picks up the slow steps. The general marking for volume is pp (very soft), repeated several times, changed by a crescendo marking only twice, both times growing to pp again. The accompaniment follows a similar pattern almost throughout the song: in one measure, the bass in the pianists left hand moves in dotted eighth notes, while the right hand regularly alternates triplet sixteenths and eighths, resulting in a subtle shift of accents, which has been described as a "trance-like mood". The voice enters after two identical measures, also moving in dotted eighth notes. The first motif is a three note stepwise descent (A sharp, G sharp, F sharp). It is immediately repeated on the word "". The text is mostly rendered simply, with only one note on each syllable. When the view changes in line 3 from observation of nature to the destination, the key shifts abruptly to B-flat major, and the word "schönsten" (most beautiful) is accented by a long high note. This climax of the first stanza is prepared by a crescendo, but again a sudden pianissimo. With the beginning of the second stanza, the key returns to F-sharp major, the melody is not identical but similar to the first stanza; the first motif appears one step higher, from B to G sharp, on "Dämmergrau", repeated on "Liebe Land". The line reaches a climax on "blaues" (blue). The text of the last three lines is repeated as a shortened version of a stanza, with the first motif in its second form this time on "gehe nicht schnell" and "eile nicht", with this emphasis on "not fast" marked "immer ruhiger (aber nicht schleppen)", which translates as "calmer and calmer (but no dragging)". The voice ends with a rising line, ending openly on C sharp, while the triplet movement stops, and the piano slowly repeats the final chord, marked ppp.

Versions by other composers 
The poem "" inspired several other composers. Max Reger set the text to music as No. 3 of his Six Songs for Medium Voice, Op. 35, in 1899. Wolfgang Jordan inserted a setting to conclude  Träume. Acht Lieder für 1 Singstimme mit Pianoforte (Dreams. Eight songs for voice with piano), published in Berlin in 1899 by Deneke. "" was composed by Alfred von Sponer as the second of Drei Lieder für 1 mittlere Singstimme mit Pianofortebegleitung (Three songs for medium voice and piano accompaniment), Op. 12, published in Leipzig in 1899 by Rieter-Biedermann. Vítězslav Novák included a composition of the text in Erotikon, Op. 46 No. 2, published in 1912. Lutz Landwehr von Pragenau set it for baritone and piano as Op. 1/2 in 1979.

References

External links 
 
 Traum durch die Dämmerung text and translation at acad.depauw.edu
 Traum durch die Dämmerung Deutsche Gedichte-Bibliothek 
 Traum durch die Dämmerung zeno.org 
 Drei Lieder mit Klavierbegleitung, op. 29: Traum durch die Dämmerung, Ausgabe 1

Songs by Richard Strauss
1895 songs
Songs based on poems